True Justice is an American television action series created by Steven Seagal that ran for two seasons in 2011 and 2012. Seagal stars as Elijah Kane, the head of the "Special Investigation Unit", an undercover police task force, in Seattle, Washington.

Cast

Main cast

Supporting cast

Series continuity and setting 

The series is notionally set in Seattle and the greater Puget Sound region, the Sheriff's Department being that of fictional Everett county, with headquarters in downtown Seattle.

Most Season one and two episodes feature plots involving an economically depressed near-to-Seattle waterfront community known as Camp Harmony, a historic World War II internment site located in what is now Puyallup, Washington. The community is portrayed as an eclectic mix of Native Americans, immigrants from east Asia, impoverished trailer-residing Caucasians, ex-convicts, and refugees from the aftermath of Hurricane Katrina.

Season one features Harmony's refugee Louisiana fishermen as integral to drug smuggling in supposedly difficult to navigate and labyrinthine waterways of the Puget Sound. Principal production and photography occurred in Vancouver, British Columbia. Second unit shots and stock footage from Seattle are used to provide localized context between scenes.

Episodes

Season 1 (2011)

Season 2 (sub-title "The Ghost", 2012)

Release 
The series first aired on Nitro, a TV station in Spain, starting on May 12, 2011. It premiered in the UK on 5 USA, with the first episode broadcast on 20 July 2011. The series started airing on Reelz Channel on March 30, 2012.

On April 26, 2012, U.S. broadcaster ReelzChannel renewed the series for a second season of 13 episodes. For the second season, the supporting cast changed slightly and had a new writing team. The second season is subtitled "The Ghost", the name of the villain that the main characters are pursuing. 5USA also broadcast the second season, starting on 4 July 2012.

Some episodes were made available in Poland on Cyfrowy Polsat VOD, between 30 September and 31 October 2011.

The series is gradually being released on DVD and Blu-ray, two episodes at a time, edited into single "movies" (see below). A box set of the first season was released in Australia by Paramount Home Entertainment on December 8, 2011.

DVDs 
True Justice was gradually released as a series of DVD (and some Blu-ray) "movies" in the UK, Germany and The Netherlands, with each disc editing together two episodes. Deadly Crossing was also released in Mexico by Videomax under their Gussi label. The releases were:

 Deadly Crossing (Season One, episodes one and two) 
 Dark Vengeance (Season One, episodes three and four)
 Street Wars (Season One, episodes five and six)
 Lethal Justice (Season One, episodes seven and eight)
 Brotherhood (Season One, episodes nine and ten)
 Urban Warfare (Season One, episodes eleven and twelve)
 Payback (German DVD exclusive release) (Season One, episode thirteen)
 Vengeance is Mine (Season Two, episodes one and two)
 Blood Alley (Season Two, episodes three and four)
 Violence of Action (Season Two, episodes five and six)
 Angel of Death (Season Two, episodes seven and eight)
 Dead Drop (Season Two, episodes nine and ten)
 One Shot One Life (German DVD exclusive release) (Season Two, episodes eleven as a bonus feature and twelve and thirteen)

Accolades

References

External links 

True Justice

2011 American television series debuts
American action television series
2010s American crime drama television series
English-language television shows
Television shows set in Seattle